Darband (دربند) is a tehsil (an administrative subdivision) of Mansehra District in the Khyber Pakhtunkhwa province of Pakistan. It was created as a separate tehsil in late August 2017 out of three union councils until then part of Oghi Tehsil: Darband itself, Nika Pani and Shanaya.

References

Union councils of Mansehra District
Populated places in Mansehra District

Darband used to called Amb state. Different Pashtun tribes live there. Famous personalities are Zar Gul, Zareen Gul, Raja Bashir, Zulfiqar Khan and others